Charles Richard Collier (1885–1954) of Plumstead, London, was a British motorcycle racer famous for winning Isle of Man TT races twice in his career. After competing in the 1906 International Cup Races on the European continent, Charlie Collier became the first Isle of Man TT race winner in 1907.

Along with his brother Harry he raced Matchless motorcycles manufactured by his father's company, H.Collier & Sons.

After setting a number of world motorcycle records on Matchless machines, Charlie Collier won another Isle of Man TT race in 1910 and later became the first competitor to be disqualified from a race for illegal refuelling. Charlie Collier later became a joint managing director of AJS and Matchless motorcycles and died in 1954.

Racing career
First race was in 1902 at the 3½ mile Canning Town cycling track riding a Matchless motorcycle with an MMC engine. After leading until the last lap, a burst tyre caused a crash and Charlie Collier suffered friction abrasions. In 1905, along with his brother Harry Collier participated in the eliminating trial for the International Motor Cycle Cup held in the Isle of Man. Held on a 25-mile section of the Gordon Bennett Trial course, the event was won by J.S.Campbell. Although Harry Collier managed to qualify, the Matchless motorcycle with a JAP engine which Charlie Collier had specially built suffered a broken connecting-rod and was forced to retire.

After racing in the 1906 International Cup, both Charlie Collier and his brother Harry were unhappy with the relatively low imposed weight limit of 110 lbs, causing sacrifices in frame and tyre strength to be made to compensate for the heavy engines.

They entered a new motorcycle event in the Isle of Man in 1907 for road-touring motorcycles. The new race was to be held on the St John's Short Course with two categories for single and twin-cylinder engines. The 1907 Isle of Man TT race single cylinder-class was won by Charlie Collier riding a Matchless in 4 hours, 8 minutes and 8 seconds at an average race speed of 38.21 mph. His brother Harry Collier, also riding a Matchless, had problems with an engine seizure on lap 2 and eventually retired on lap 9.

TT race achievements

TT Single Cylinder race
Tuesday 28 May 1907 - 10 laps (158.00 miles) St John's Short Course.

TT Race Victories

TT career summary

Sources

External links
 TT database rider profile iomtt.com
 TT database TT results iomtt.com
 Official TT Website Database iomttraces.com

0

1885 births
1954 deaths
People from Plumstead
English motorcycle racers
Isle of Man TT riders